Francesco Pezzulli (born 14 May 1973) is an Italian actor and  voice actor.

Biography
Born in Naples, Pezzulli began his career as a child actor on film and television in 1983 but he is best known as a voice actor. He is well noted for being the official Italian voice of Leonardo DiCaprio. Some of Pezzulli’s popular Italian voice roles include Dawson Leery (portrayed by James Van Der Beek) in Dawson's Creek, Jesse Pinkman (portrayed by Aaron Paul) in Breaking Bad and Anakin Skywalker (portrayed by Hayden Christensen) in the Star Wars prequel trilogy.

Pezzulli has voiced many animated characters, most notably Inuyasha from the series with the same name, and has also voiced several film characters, such as Crash in the Ice Age franchise and Elliot in Open Season.

Personal life
Pezzulli is the younger brother of corporate hedge funds lawyer Bepi Pezzulli. He also has a son, Sebastiano. He currently lives in Rome.

Dubbing roles

Animation
Crash in Ice Age: The Meltdown
Crash in Ice Age: Dawn of the Dinosaurs
Crash in Ice Age: Continental Drift
Crash in Ice Age: Collision Course
Elliot in Open Season
Elliot in Open Season 2
Elliot in Open Season 3
Elliot in Open Season: Scared Silly
Inuyasha in Inuyasha (seasons 2-6)
Inuyasha in Inuyasha the Movie: Affections Touching Across Time
Inuyasha in Inuyasha the Movie: The Castle Beyond the Looking Glass
Inuyasha in Inuyasha the Movie: Swords of an Honorable Ruler
Inuyasha in Inuyasha the Movie: Fire on the Mystic Island
Kevin in Ed, Edd n' Eddy
Lucien Cramp in The Cramp Twins
Anakin Skywalker in Star Wars: Clone Wars
Anakin Skywalker in Star Wars: The Clone Wars
Sam Speed in Sonic X
Prince Naveen in The Princess and the Frog
Garth in Alpha and Omega
Nuka in The Lion King II: Simba's Pride
Nuka in The Lion Guard
Nelson Muntz in The Simpsons (seasons 16-17)
Joaquín Mondragon Jr. in The Book of Life
Sonic in Wreck-It Ralph
Sonic in Ralph Breaks the Internet
Señor Senior Jr. in Kim Possible (2nd voice)
Peng in Duck Duck Goose
Sacha in Noah's Island
Dwayne in Total Drama
Karl in Princess Sissi (1st voice)
James Derrick / Jason Derrick in Captain Tsubasa
Mark Beaks in DuckTales
Andrew in Rapunzel's Tangled Adventure
Zini in Dinosaur
Justforkix in Asterix and the Vikings

Live action
Romeo Montague in William Shakespeare's Romeo + Juliet
Jack Dawson in Titanic
Brandon Darrow in Celebrity
Richard in The Beach
Amsterdam Vallon in Gangs of New York
Frank Abagnale in Catch Me If You Can
Howard Hughes in The Aviator
Danny Archer in Blood Diamond
William Costigan in The Departed
Leonardo DiCaprio in The 11th Hour
Roger Ferris in Body of Lies
Frank Wheeler in Revolutionary Road
Teddy Daniels in Shutter Island
Dom Cobb in Inception
Jim Carroll in The Basketball Diaries
J. Edgar Hoover in J. Edgar
Calvin J. Candie in Django Unchained
Jay Gatsby in The Great Gatsby
Jordan Belfort in The Wolf of Wall Street
Hugh Glass in The Revenant
Rick Dalton in Once Upon a Time in Hollywood
Alex Kerner in Good Bye, Lenin!
Salvador Puig Antich in Salvador
Lukas in 2 Days in Paris
Fredrick Zoller in Inglourious Basterds
David Kern in Lila, Lila
Álex in Eva
Niki Lauda in Rush
Daniel Domscheit-Berg in The Fifth Estate
Max in A Most Wanted Man
Hubertus Czernin in Woman in Gold
Daniel in Colonia
Tony Balerdi in Burnt
Helmut Zemo in Captain America: Civil War
Inspector Escherich in Alone in Berlin
Lutz Heck in The Zookeeper's Wife
Laszlo Kreizler in The Alienist
Dawson Leery in Dawson's Creek
James Van Der Beek in Don't Trust the B---- in Apartment 23
James Van Der Beek in Jay and Silent Bob Strike Back
Will Stokes in Friends with Better Lives
Matt Bromley in Pose
Rick Sanford in Angus
Anesthesiologist in Downsizing
Jesse Pinkman in Breaking Bad
Jesse Pinkman in El Camino: A Breaking Bad Movie
Tobey Marshall in Need for Speed
J.J. Maguire in A Long Way Down
Phil Stanton in Central Intelligence
Bryan Palmer in Welcome Home
Eddie Lane in The Path
Anakin Skywalker in Star Wars: Episode II – Attack of the Clones
Anakin Skywalker in  Star Wars: Episode III – Revenge of the Sith
Anakin Skywalker in Star Wars: Episode IX – The Rise of Skywalker
Stephen Glass in Shattered Glass
Billy Quinn in Factory Girl
David Rice in Jumper
Lorenzo de Lamberti in Virgin Territory
Bobby Drake / Iceman in X2
Bobby Drake / Iceman in X-Men: The Last Stand
Bobby Drake / Iceman in X-Men: Days of Future Past
Eric in The Ruins
James Lacey in The Escapist
Howard Stark in Captain America: The First Avenger
Henry Sturges in Abraham Lincoln: Vampire Hunter
Mitch Brockden in Reasonable Doubt
Llane Wrynn in Warcraft
Ollie Slocumb in Igby Goes Down
Martijn in Five Fingers
Shane Dekker in Chaos
Eric O'Neill in Breach
Louis Ross Roulet in The Lincoln Lawyer
Xavier in Pot Luck
Xavier in Russian Dolls
Thomas Seyr in The Beat That My Heart Skipped
Pierre in Paris
Manu in Dobermann
Louis Échard in Populaire
Jesse Swanson in Pitch Perfect
Jesse Swanson in Pitch Perfect 2
Seth MacFarlane in Movie 43
Gordie Lachance in Stand by Me
Richard "Data" Wang in The Goonies
Clay Miller in Friday the 13th
Jake Sully in Avatar
Daryl Dixon in The Walking Dead
Marty Deeks in NCIS: Los Angeles
Todd Quinlan in Scrubs
Sportacus in LazyTown
Ramsay Bolton in Game of Thrones
Clyde Barrow in Bonnie & Clyde
Jim Hawkins in Muppet Treasure Island
Tom Stansfield in My Boss's Daughter
Matthew in The Dreamers
Blake in Last Days
Hervé Joncour in Silk
Paul in Funny Games
Justin Redman in DodgeBall: A True Underdog Story
Matthew Farrell in Live Free or Die Hard
Todd in Serious Moonlight
Sherlock Holmes in Sherlock

References

External links

1973 births
Living people
Male actors from Naples
Italian male voice actors
Italian male film actors
Italian male television actors
Italian male child actors
Italian voice directors
20th-century Italian male actors
21st-century Italian male actors